Boston City Council elections were held on November 3, 2009. Eight seats (four district representatives and four at-large members) were contested in the general election, as the incumbents in districts 2, 3, 4, 5, and 6 were unopposed. Seven seats (the four at-large members, and districts 1, 7, and 9) had also been contested in the preliminary election held on September 22, 2009.

At-large
Councillors John R. Connolly and Stephen J. Murphy were re-elected to their at-large seats. Incumbents Michael F. Flaherty and Sam Yoon did not run for re-election as they were running for Mayor of Boston; their seats were won by Felix G. Arroyo and Ayanna Pressley. Pressley's victory made her first woman of color to be elected to the council in its history.

District 1
Councillor Salvatore LaMattina was re-elected.

District 2
Councillor Bill Linehan ran unopposed.

District 3
Councillor Maureen Feeney ran unopposed.

District 4
Councillor Charles Yancey ran unopposed.

District 5
Councillor Robert Consalvo ran unopposed.

District 6

General election
Councillor John M. Tobin, Jr. ran unopposed.

Special election
In August 2010, Tobin resigned his seat to take a position as Vice President for City and Community Affairs at Northeastern University. The seat was filled via a special election on November 16, 2010, with the preliminary election on October 19, 2010. Matt O'Malley was elected to serve the remainder of Tobin's term, defeating James W. Hennigan III, brother of former council member Maura Hennigan.

District 7

General election
Councillor Chuck Turner was re-elected.

Special election
On December 1, 2010, Turner was expelled by an 11–1 vote, following his corruption conviction, making him the first councillor to be expelled in the history of the modern Boston City Council. This created a vacancy that needed to be filled by a special election, which took place on March 15, 2011, with the preliminary election on February 15, 2011. Tito Jackson was elected to serve the remainder of Turner's term.

District 8
Councillor Michael P. Ross was re-elected.

District 9
Councillor Mark Ciommo was re-elected.

See also
 List of members of Boston City Council
 Boston mayoral election, 2009

References

External links
 2009 Election Results at boston.gov

City Council election
Boston City Council elections
Boston city council
Boston City Council